2011 BDO Canadian Open of Curling may refer to one of the following:

2011 BDO Canadian Open of Curling (January), the Grand Slam held in January 2011 as part of the 2010–11 curling season
2011 BDO Canadian Open of Curling (December), the Grand Slam held in December 2011 as part of the 2011–12 curling season